The Visitor is an album by Mick Fleetwood, released by RCA Records in 1981. All the songs were recorded in Accra, Ghana between January and February 1981 at the "Ghana Film Industries, Inc. Studio" and produced by Richard Dashut, and were later mixed in various studios in England.

Two of the tracks were covers of Fleetwood Mac songs: "Rattlesnake Shake" was originally recorded for the 1969 album Then Play On, and "Walk a Thin Line" first appeared on the 1979 album Tusk. Peter Green sang lead vocals and played lead guitar on "Rattlesnake Shake", and was credited as Peter Greenbaum. George Harrison appeared on "Walk a Thin Line".

The album has been re-released several times, most recently with a US CD release by Wounded Bird Records on October 18, 2011.

George Hawkins, who performs most of the lead vocals on this album, later appeared on the I’m Not Me album from 1983 as a member and co-lead vocalist of Mick Fleetwood’s Zoo.

Track listing

Charts

Personnel
Mick Fleetwood – drums, percussion; water gong on "Don't Be Sorry, Just Be Happy"
George Hawkins – vocals, bass guitar, piano, organ;  guitar on "Walk a Thin Line"
Todd Sharp – lead guitar, rhythm guitar
Lord Tiki – hand drums
Ebaali Gbiko – hand drums, backing vocals
Accra Roman Catholic Choir – backing vocals
Superbrains – percussion
Adjo Group – vocals, percussion
The Ghana Folkloric Group – vocals, percussion
Guest Musicians
Peter Green – lead guitar and lead vocals on "Rattlesnake Shake", theme guitar on "Super Brains"
George Harrison – slide guitar, 12-string guitar and backing vocals on "Walk a Thin Line"
Ian Bairnson – lead guitar on "Not Fade Away", rhythm guitar on "Cassiopeia Surrender"
Richard Dashut – additional percussion on "Rattlenake Shake"
Sara Fleetwood – backing vocals on "Walk a Thin Line"
Mike Moran – Prophet 5 synthesizer on "The Visitor"
Andrew Powell – string arrangement on  "Rattlesnake Shake" and "You Weren't in Love"

Credits
Executive producer – Mickey Shapiro
Produced by Mick Fleetwood and Richard Dashut
Engineered by Bill Youdelman, Randy Ezratty, and Richard Dashut

References

External links
Entry at Fleetwoodmac.net
Entry at Discogs.com

Mick Fleetwood albums
1981 debut albums
RCA Records albums
Albums produced by Mick Fleetwood
Albums produced by Richard Dashut
Song recordings produced by Richard Dashut